Derrick Lamont Hamilton (born May 20, 1966) is a former professional basketball player. He played college basketball at the University of Southern Mississippi in the late 1980s. Hamilton was drafted by the New Jersey Nets in the third round of the 1988 NBA draft but was not signed to a contract. He would later play for several teams in Europe.

Professional career 
Hamilton was drafted by the New Jersey Nets in the third round of the 1988 NBA draft but did sign to a contract with them. Despite not making the NBA, Hamilton had a long career in European leagues. He had a notable career in the Greek League playing for Sporting, AEK Athens, Apollon Patras and Irakleio. He also played in the Spanish second division, with Proexinca CB Cartagena for two seasons and in the Israeli League with Hapoel Jerusalem, where he was nicknamed "The Glue", due to his tremendous contribution to team chemistry.

Prior to that, he also played with the Israeli clubs Hapoel Holon and Hapoel Eilat. He played at the end of his career in Europe with the Russian Super League club Dynamo Moscow.

Personal life
Hamilton is the cousin of former Duke basketball player Antonio Lang, who won 2 NCAA titles and had playing stints in the NBA, CBA and overseas, before embarking into coaching; He is also the older brother of Angelo Hamilton, who led Connors State College to the 1990 NJCAA national title, and later played at University of Oklahoma, before embarking on stints overseas and with the Continental Basketball Association. His son Kyle Hamilton, is a safety for the Baltimore Ravens, of the NFL.

References

External links 
 Euroleague.net Profile
 FIBAEurope Profile
 Israel Super League Profile
 Greek Basket League Profile

1966 births
Living people
20th-century African-American sportspeople
21st-century African-American people
AEK B.C. players
African-American basketball players
Alaska Aces (PBA) players
American expatriate basketball people in Greece
American expatriate basketball people in Israel
American expatriate basketball people in Russia
American expatriate basketball people in the Philippines
American men's basketball players
Apollon Patras B.C. players
Basketball players from Alabama
Basket Rimini Crabs players
BC Dynamo Moscow players
Greek Basket League players
Hapoel Eilat basketball players
Hapoel Holon players
Hapoel Jerusalem B.C. players
Hapoel Tel Aviv B.C. players
Irakleio B.C. players
Israeli Basketball Premier League players
New Jersey Nets draft picks
Philippine Basketball Association imports
Small forwards
Southern Miss Golden Eagles basketball players
Sporting basketball players
Sportspeople from Mobile, Alabama
TNT Tropang Giga players